Channel UFX is a multilingual lifestyle music channel from South India. Channel UFX  was officially launched on Saturday, 29 May 2010 at Hotel Park Sheraton. This 24-hour lifestyle music entertainment channel is owned by UF Group.

Programs

Famebook
Famebook is a half hour VJ-based celebrity chat show. The show enables viewers to catch up with what is latest in their favorite celebrity's life, their latest films etc. In June 2011, the Famebook team interviewed South Indian actress Gautami.

Food Bowl
Food Bowl is a VJ-based culinary show. Along with the crew, the VJ travels across South India to explore the diverse food habits in the region.

FEWS
Films and Entertainment News (FEWS) features the latest Audio Launches, Film Muhurats, Film – On Location, 100 Day Functions, Behind the scenes, Song Sequences and more. In July 2010 the FEWS team presented a documentary about the Arya and Amy Jackson film Madrasapattinam

Unreserved
Unreserved is a VJ-based travel show. The team travels with a camera crew to scenic and panoramic places of southern India. Special episodes feature in-depth city, beach, shopping, history, and festival guides. The show often goes beyond usual tourist destinations. Unreserved - Offroad covered the western ghats region at the Tamil Nadu and Kerala state border in 2011.

References

Music television channels in India